El Modena High School, colloquially called El Mo or ElMo, is a traditional four-year public high school located in the El Modena neighborhood of the City of Orange in Orange County, California. It is one of four high schools in the Orange Unified School District, along with Villa Park High School, Orange High School, and Canyon High School.

Founded in 1966, its first class graduated in June 1968, the school celebrated its 50th anniversary during the 2016-17 school year. In 2019 construction began after district voters approved Measure S in November 2016.

History

Nature Center 
In 1972 El Modena chemistry teacher Jeanne Cater established the school's Nature Center. It is dedicated to teaching water conservation, ecological principles and research techniques to students and community members. On February 2nd 2023, the Orange Unified School District Board of Trustees voted unanimously to rename the center the "Jeanne Carter Nature Center" in honor of its founder.

Gender-Sexuality Alliance 
In August 1999, Anthony Colin ("Colin") decided to form a "Gay-Straight Alliance" (now Gay–straight alliance) after Matthew Shepard, a young man from Wyoming, died after being brutally assaulted due to his homosexuality. Colin wanted to form the club to promote acceptance among and for gay and straight students at the school. Colin asked Mrs. Maryina Herde, a drama and English teacher at the school, to serve as the faculty advisor and she accepted.

The Orange Unified School District board refused permission for students to form the club. Students in the club sued the school board, claiming that their rights under the First Amendment and the 1984 Equal Access Act had been violated.

In the first ruling of its kind, Judge David O. Carter of the United States District Court for the Central District of California issued a preliminary injunction ordering the school to allow the GSA to meet.

Extracurricular activities

Athletics
A vanguard, used as the school's mascot, is a soldier in the foremost division or the front part of an army. Vanguards are the troops assembled in the front line when going into battle, which is why the school newspaper is titled The Frontline. The school contains a variety of sports that they excel in, including but not limited to : Tennis, Basketball, Football, Volleyball, Sprints, Hurdles, Distance Running, Cross Country, Pole Vault, High Jump, Long Jump, Shot Put, Discus, Water Polo, Swim, Soccer, Lacrosse, Baseball, Wrestling, Dance, Cheer, Pom, and Softball.  

 Wrestling: CIF champions in 2000, 2003, and 2014.
 Softball: CIF champions in 2008
 Football: CIF champions in 1978, 1983,1984 and 2017 
 Volleyball: CIF and State champions in 2019

Music 
El Modena's instrumental music program consists of a concert band, orchestra, jazz band, and marching band. As of 2023, the program had 90 students.

The marching band and color guard compete in the AA Gold competition of the California State Band Championships circuit and compete in the Western Band Association. They play their field show every home game during halftime.

During the winter season, the marching band percussion section forms the Vanguard Percussion Ensemble (VPE). The Colorguard forms the El Modena Winter Guard. These groups, since 1975, traditionally perform on a tarp inside of the basketball court of high school gym. The Vanguard Percussion Ensemble has compete in circuits such as ADLA and WGI, winning ADLA championships in 2017

Notable alumni

Ronnie Creager – skateboarder
Mikey Day (1998) – actor, comedian, Saturday Night Live
Freddie Freeman (2007) – MLB first baseman for Los Angeles Dodgers
Robby Gordon – race car driver
Brittany Ishibashi - actress
Michael Pitre - American football coach for the Atlanta Falcons
Jeff Spek – NFL and USFL tight end
Michael Terry (athlete) (1991) – Olympic and NCAA athlete, track and field
Milo Ventimiglia (1995) – film and television actor, Gilmore Girls
Haylie Wagner - softball player

References

External links 
Official school website

El Modena High School Alumni Association
El Modena Frontline

Educational institutions established in 1966
1966 establishments in California
Education in Orange, California
High schools in Orange County, California
Public high schools in California
El Modena, Orange, California